Dala Modu was an important  Sierra Leonean Susu trader and translator between the British Colonial Government and the local chiefs in the interior in the early decades of the British Colony in Sierra Leone. His efforts helped in resolving a number of conflicts between the colonial and interior rulers. His reputation as a major commercial force was enhanced in the process, and he built up the prominent Soso community around Lungi in the Kafu Bullom country.

Early life
Dala Modu was born in 1770 in Wonkafong, Sumbuya near Conakry, Guinea into a family of traders. His father, Fenda Modu, had been advisor to the King of Sumbuya and Headman of Wonkafong. Although born in Guinea, he was raised in Freetown. Dala Modu first came to Freetown at the age of four years, with his father in 1774. Desirous of fostering his commercial contacts with the new colony, Fenda Modu sent his son Dala Modu with fifty followers in 1795 to settle on the outskirts of Freetown. The town Dala Modu built up there, named Dalamodiya after him, quickly became a commercial centre, and he became landlord for many traders from the interior, mostly from his own Soso ethnic group. Dala Modu was welcomed by the British, who were also keen on developing the trade with the interior on which the colony's survival depended. In Freetown Dala Modu learned English and studied the colony's monetary system and weights and measures.

Career
Dala Modu's business activities became very extensive, involving colony officials, both European and African, and the local traders, for whom he acted as agent. He became the primary landlord to visiting traders from the distant interior, giving them advice and assistance on how to get the best out of their trade goods in the colony. In this process, he developed close contacts with the Freetown merchants to whom he directed the interior traders.

Dala Modu became the local agent to the European firm of Macaulay and Babington in 1826. The European agent of that Company, Kenneth Macaulay, was a close associate of Dala Modu when he acted as governor in that year. Modu organised the felling and processing of timber for the company from his base at Madina on the Bullom Shore, where he had lived since 1806. This was done with a large band of servile labour he retained there. For the 1826 season alone, he received £1,000 as partial payment. In 1834, many gold traders from the interior came to the colony through him, bringing him much wealth in broker's fees.

Dala Modu used his wealth and business contacts to build for himself a prominent position in the relations between the colony officials and the local rulers in the interior. He was helped in this by his powerful family connections in the Northern River areas (north of the Scarcies), where his family owned parts of the major trading islands. These came in handy in treaties of cession he negotiated in 1818 and 1825 with the colonial government, which was eager to use these islands, like Matacong and the Isles de Los, as customs posts.

But Dala Modu's personal qualities of diplomacy undoubtedly played a major role in winning the favoured position he came to enjoy. As early as 1802, soon after the rebellion of the Nova Scotian settlers in the colony, Dala Modu was instrumental in convincing the Mandinka chiefs to withdraw their support for the rebels and to hand over the leaders of the uprising to the British. But, in 1806, he was accused of slave trading and other charges. When called to answer these charges, he appeared in Muslim robes rather than the European dress he was used to wearing in Freetown. This angered the British authorities, who proceeded to expel him from the colony. Dala Modu then moved to Madina on the Bullom Shore from where he continued his business activities. It was there that he built up the Sosso community with migrants coming from the interior. Dala Modu thus because effectively the King of Kafu Bullom and Loko Masama, but his influence extended as far as the Port Loko areas. In fact, he became ruler of Rokon on the Rokel in 1837.

The colonial government in Freetown soon realized that it needed Dala Modu's services in settling disputes in the interior. From 1818, when he arranged the cession of the Isles de Los to the British, he started receiving an annual payment from them. Between 1820 and 1841, Dala Modu arranged peace talks on a number of occasions to settle local disputes the Colony Government felt were inhibiting trade. These included the rebellion on the north Rokel in 1835, and the Temne/Loko war in 1836. Though he did not get along well with some of the governors, succeeding ones were quick to realise his worth and do business with him. Governor Henry Dundas Campbell visited him in 1835 and was struck by his intelligence and affluent style of living.

When Dala Modu died, over eighty cows were slaughtered during his funeral ceremonies, attended by British and African officials from the colony and by many local chiefs from the interior. Dala Modu was among the first indigenous entrepreneurs to take advantage of the new business opportunities arising after the abolition of the slave trade.

References

 

1770 births
Year of death missing
Sierra Leonean businesspeople
Sierra Leonean people of Guinean descent
Susu people